Highlight is the third Korean studio album by South Korean boy group, Beast. It was released on July 4, 2016 and is also the group's first Korean release since Hyunseung's departure from the group. It was also the last album under the name "Beast" and under Cube Entertainment.

The album contains 12 tracks including the lead single "Ribbon" and the pre-released track "Butterfly".

Track listing

Charts

Weekly charts

Year-end charts

References

2016 albums
Highlight (band) albums
Cube Entertainment albums
Korean-language albums